Gedersdorf is a municipality in the district of Krems-Land in the Austrian state of Lower Austria.

Geography
The municipality consists of seven villages: Altweidling, Brunn im Felde, Donaudorf, Gedersdorf, Schlickendorf, Stratzdorf, and Theiß.

History
It was formed in 1967 by the merger of three smaller municipalities.

References

Cities and towns in Krems-Land District